Zulfiyya Huseynova (born 15 October 1970) is an Azerbaijani former judoka who competed in the 1996 Summer Olympics and in the 2000 Summer Olympics.

References

1970 births
Living people
Azerbaijani female judoka
Olympic judoka of Azerbaijan
Judoka at the 1996 Summer Olympics
Judoka at the 2000 Summer Olympics
20th-century Azerbaijani women
21st-century Azerbaijani women